Sadie Macdonald  (née Murn; 3 July 1886 – 12 May 1966) was a New Zealand nurse and community leader. She was born in Gulgong, New South Wales, Australia, on 3 July 1886.

In the 1938 King's Birthday Honours, Macdonald was appointed an Officer of the Order of the British Empire, for social welfare services.

References

1886 births
1966 deaths
New Zealand nurses
Australian emigrants to New Zealand
New Zealand women nurses
Place of death missing
New Zealand Officers of the Order of the British Empire